Leonardo Gastón Squadrone (born 1 December 1971 in La Plata) is a retired Argentine association football player.

References

External links
 

Living people
1971 births
Footballers from La Plata
Argentine footballers
Argentine expatriate footballers
Argentine expatriate sportspeople in the United States
Association football defenders
Estudiantes de La Plata footballers
Club Atlético Lanús footballers
Club Atlético Huracán footballers
New England Revolution players
Major League Soccer players